Oppuurs is a village in the Belgian province of Antwerp. It is a part of the municipality of Puurs-Sint-Amands. Oppuurs has 2,048 inhabitants as of 2021.

History 

The first time Oppuurs was mentioned was in 1414, when it was called Oppuedersel. In the 15th century, it was owned by the Van der Calsteren family. Later, Joost Snoy became the owner. In 1664, it was elevated to a barony. Later, in 1777, the properties were bought by Philippe Ghislain Snoy, who became baron. On 7 May 1818, Idisbalda-Ghislain Snoy was appointed mayor by the king.

Oppuurs was part of the municipality of Puurs, and was separated from it in 1803. It was an independent municipality until 1976 when it became, along with Lippelo, part of the municipality of Sint-Amands.

Demography

Evolution of the population

19th century

20th century  until 1976

Gallery

References

Populated places in Antwerp Province
Puurs-Sint-Amands